Wong Kam Fook (born 17 March 1949) is a former Malaysian football goalkeeper.

Career
Wong played for Perak FA in Malaysia Cup tournament until 1972, winning the 1970 Malaysia Cup. He also played for the Malaysia national football team, and was in the team that qualified to the 1972 Munich Olympics football competition.
In the finals, Wong played all three group games. 

After the tournament, Wong migrated to Hong Kong, turning professional and playing for Seiko, Rangers, South China and Caroline Hill, spanning from 1972 until 1984.

In 2004, he was inducted in Olympic Council of Malaysia's Hall of Fame for 1972 Summer Olympics football team.

Personal life
Wong resides in Hong Kong after his playing career ended. His son, Oscar Wong Tse Yang, also plays football as a goalkeeper, and has played professionally for teams in Hong Kong and Malaysia.

Honours
Perak
Malaysia Cup: 1970

South China
Hong Kong First Division League: 1975–76

Seiko
Hong Kong First Division League: 1981–82, 1982–83

Malaysia
Asian Games: Bronze medal 1974

References

Living people
1949 births
South China AA players
Seiko SA players
Hong Kong Rangers FC players
Hong Kong First Division League players
Malaysian expatriate sportspeople in Hong Kong
Expatriate footballers in Hong Kong
Malaysian sportspeople of Chinese descent
Malaysian footballers
Malaysian expatriate footballers
Malaysia international footballers
Olympic footballers of Malaysia
Footballers at the 1972 Summer Olympics
Perak F.C. players
Association football goalkeepers